is a fictional character in the Street Fighter video game series. He is the martial arts master who trained Ryu and Ken, as well as the elder brother and former training partner of Akuma. Gouken is usually depicted as a bearded man who wears Japamala prayer beads on his neck and a karate gi with the kanji mu (無) or "void" sewn to the back. Although Gouken has been a supporting character in the Street Fighter series since Super Street Fighter II Turbo, he did not make his first full-fledged appearance in the video game until his appearance as a hidden character in Street Fighter IV.

Development
While the backstory for the early installments of the Street Fighter series established that Ryu and Ken trained under the same martial arts master and that the master was killed by his brother, the identity of this character was originally unnamed. The instruction manual for the North American and European versions of Street Fighter II for the SNES identified Ryu and Ken's master under the name of Sheng Long, a name derived from a mistranslation of Ryu's victory phrase in the arcade version of the game ("You must defeat Sheng Long to stand a chance"), which was also basis of the hoax character of the same name. Sheng Long was later used as the name of Ryu and Ken's master in the Malibu Comics and Movie game.

Gouken as a character was originally conceived in the Masaomi Kanzaki manga Street Fighter II: Ryu, an adaptation of the original Street Fighter II showcased in Japan's Family Computer Magazine (and later adapted into English under the simplified title Street Fighter II). Capcom later revealed Gouken as a playable character for Street Fighter IV. His presence in the game was hinted months before his official appearance in the game, with Street Fighter IV project manager Natsuki Shiozawa showing a silhouetted illustration in her blog, claiming that the character was "Sheng Long", as well as the character being featured in an animated teaser for the console versions of Street Fighter IV and in Akumas ending in the game. This was corroborated by comments Street Fighter IV producer Yoshinori Ono made in an interview published in the January 2008 Issue of Electronic Gaming Monthly, which Executive editor Shane Bettenhausen took this to mean the planned appearance of Sheng Long or Gouken in Street Fighter IV. Ono later confirmed in an interview with Play magazine that Gouken's inclusion in the title was fan service in response to fans requesting Sheng Long's presence in the game.

Fictional background

In the storyline of Street Fighter II: Ryu, Gouken trained Ryu and Ken in his temple somewhere in the Japanese wilderness. One day, Akuma stormed Goukens dojo and killed him, leaving Ryu and Ken with the duty to avenge their masters death. While the novel took liberties with the established canon of the games, Goukens character would be adapted in the storyline of the later games in the series following Akuma's introduction in Super Street Fighter II Turbo.

According to the backstory that was developed for Super Street Fighter II Turbo and the Street Fighter Alpha series, Gouken and Akuma learned a murderous martial art style from their master, . It included the special techniques the Hadouken, the Shoryuken and the Tatsumaki Senpukyaku, 20 years before the Street Fighter tournament. After Goutetsu was killed by Akuma, Gouken refined these special techniques, eliminating the "murderous energy" they possessed and developed them into a purely combative martial art. He would then teach this new style to two students, Ryu and Ken. Gouken also trained Dan at one time, but then expelled him after seeing that Dan was motivated by revenge.

Gouken makes an appearance in Akuma's ending in the original Street Fighter Alpha, in which he is depicted as a white-bearded old man with bushy eyebrows. Akumas dialogue exchange with Ryu in Street Fighter Alpha 2 suggest that Akuma killed Gouken prior to the events of the Alpha series. Suzaku Castle, Ryu's home stage in the Street Fighter II series, Street Fighter Alpha 2 and Street Fighter III 3rd Strike, is the apparent resting place of Gouken.

Gouken makes his first full-fledged appearance as a fighter in the arcade version of Street Fighter IV, where he appears as a secret computer-controlled challenger. Capcom retconned Gouken's apparent death during his battle with Akuma. In Gouken's animated opening he reveals that after losing in battle to Akuma, he did not die but was simply rendered unconscious for an extended period of time. Gouken survived the Shun Goku Satsu by completely emptying his soul of emotions, which left him in a deep coma. He is shown watching as Ryu and Ken walk off, believing him, Gouken, to be dead. He is not concerned, however, what Ryu and Ken believe as he knows that their path is a righteous one and that he looks forward to reuniting with them once more someday. Gouken's mid-game cutscene show him confront Ryu, much to Ryu's disbelief, for a friendly master versus student spar in which Gouken is victorious. In his animated ending, Gouken faces Ryu again, finding that his student is being overtaken by the murderous energy, defeats him and suppresses, after which he notices Akuma is in the area. He also appears again in Akuma's animated ending. In this scene, after Ryu has been defeated by Gouken, Akuma appears and challenges his brother to a fight to the death with the winner claiming Ryu.

Techniques
In addition, he also has Ryu's  as a second Ultra Combo in Super Street Fighter IV.

In other media
In addition to his debut in the Masaomi Kanzaki's manga adaptation of Street Fighter II, Gouken also played a role in Masahiko Nakahira's manga adaptations of Street Fighter Alpha and Street Fighter III: Ryu Final, where he appears in flashbacks involving Ryu and Ken's training days. The Alpha manga differs from the back-story of the games in which it was Goutetsu, rather Gouken, who refined their martial art from an art of assassination to a pure martial art. In addition, the manga also established that Gouken forbade Ryu and Ken the use of the Shōryūken. Ryu Final depicts the battle between Gouken and Akuma, which results in the destruction of a forest and the collapse of a hill. The prayer beads worn by Akuma are the same ones that originally belonged to Gouken. Gouken also appears in the Street Fighter episode "The World's Greatest Warrior", with his character design being similar to those in prior Street Fighter manga.

Gouken's role in UDON Entertainment's Street Fighter comic series is much the same as his official story. Gouken raised Ryu, an orphaned boy, in the ways of his martial art. During his training, Gouken committed himself to teaching Ryu only the non-lethal arts, sparing him from the darkness that would come from teaching him the full range of techniques (the side that embraces the Satsui no Hadō, or "Killing Intent"). He also would train the son of an American businessman, Ken Masters, much in the same way. Gouken maintains a difference in philosophy from his brother, Akuma, who believes that the only true mastery comes from training in all facets of their art. This eventually leads to his death during Ryu's absence from the dojo to attend the first Street Fighter tournament. Akuma challenges Gouken to a mortal battle and Gouken is defeated. For the remainder of the comic series, Ryu dedicates himself to forcing out the negativity that wells up within him and adhering to his master's precepts and teachings of humanity and respect for one's opponent. However, he also yearns to avenge Gouken's death and will seek out Akuma at any cost. This all comes to a head at the conclusion of the series (during the third series of comics, Street Fighter II Turbo) when Ryu is attending M. Bison's Street Fighter tournament. Akuma intervenes before the final battle of the tournament between Ryu and Bison and defeats Bison so he may fight Ryu. The two clash but Akuma still overpowers Ryu. Before he can land the final blow, Gouken's spirit is revived and engages a shocked Akuma. The two warriors battle to an unseen conclusion.

Japanese actors Akira Koieyama and Shogen Itokazu portrayed older and younger Gouken respectively in the TV series Street Fighter: Assassin's Fist.

Reception
Ryan Clements from IGN commented that Gouken is one of the best new characters from Street Fighter IV, recommending him highly due to his large number of combos and originality. Cam Shea of IGN AU held similar praise, adding "He just exudes power." Randolph Ramsay of GameSpot shared the sentiment, noting that while Gouken had the same fighting style as Ryu and Ken he was unique and powerful. On the other hand, Game Revolution reviewer Nick Tan criticized Gouken's moves for being much stronger than those of many other characters, making evading them almost impossible. GamesRadar mentioned that they want to see a matchup between Gouken and Jinpachi Mishima on their "12 matchups we want to see in Street Fighter X Tekken" list, exclaiming "Roided out Rumble in the retirement home!". In 2016, Screen Rant named Gouken the "7th Most Powerful Street Fighter Character", adding "As the master of Ryu and Ken, and the older brother of Akuma, it’s no surprise that Gouken would be a powerful figure in the Street Fighter universe." In their rankings of Street Fighter characters, Paste ranked Gouken at 54th place, adding "He can be an extremely punishing character, but still falls into the crowded shoto category and fails to be a more memorable fighter because of it." Den of Geek ranked Gouken as the "37th Best Street Fighter Character", stating "He’s like the antithesis of Dan and Sean in that his fighting style differentiates itself from Ryu, Ken, and Akuma, but in a way that makes him appear more masterful. More power and less wasted movement."

See also
 Sheng Long, a hoax character conceived from a mistranslation in the original Street Fighter II

References

Bibliography
 
 

Ansatsuken
Fictional Japanese people in video games
Fictional judoka
Fictional jujutsuka
Fictional karateka
Fictional kenpō practitioners
Fictional martial arts trainers
Fictional martial artists in video games
Fictional Shorinji Kempo practitioners
Fictional shotokan practitioners
Fictional taekwondo practitioners
Male characters in video games
Street Fighter characters
Video game bosses
Video game characters introduced in 1993
Video game characters who can move at superhuman speeds
Video game characters with superhuman strength